Bonab, Banab, Benab, Binab, Ban Ab, or Bunab may refer to:

Places

Iran
East Azerbaijan Province
Bonab, city and county seat of Bonab County
Bonab Jadid, city and site of nuclear research center
Bonab County
Bonab Rural District (Marand County)

Fars Province
Bonab, Darab, a village in Darab County

Hormozgan Province
Bonab, Hormozgan, a village in Hajjiabad County

Kerman Province
Ban Ab, Kerman, a village in Baft County

Zanjan Province
Binab, Zanjan, a village in Zanjan County
Bonab Rural District (Zanjan County)

Ivory Coast
 Banabo, also known Banab, a village in Lacs District, Ivory Coast

Kenya
Bunaba also Bunab, a town in Western Province at

Other uses
BunaB, a novelty device